Lisa Raymond and Samantha Stosur were the defending women's doubles champions at the 2007 Pacific Life Open tennis tournament played at the Indian Wells Tennis Garden in Indian Wells, California, USA. They were seeded first of the 16 doubles teams that participated and extended their title by beating Chan Yung-jan and Chuang Chia-jung 6–3, 7–5 in the final.

Seeds 

  Lisa Raymond Samantha Stosur (champions)
  Yan Zi Zheng Jie (quarterfinals)
  Virginia Ruano Pascual Paola Suárez (second round)
  Nathalie Dechy Vera Zvonareva (semifinals)
  Chan Yung-jan Chuang Chia-jung (final)
  Elena Likhovtseva Anabel Medina Garrigues (quarterfinals)
  Janette Husárová Meghann Shaughnessy (first round)
  Vania King   Shahar Pe'er (quarterfinals)

Draw

Final

Earlier rounds

Top half

Bottom half

References

External links 
 Draw

Women's Doubles